Belkovsky may refer to:
Stanislav Belkovsky, Russian political analyst
Belkovsky Island, Russia
Belkovsky Rural Administrative Okrug of Pochepsky District, Bryansk Oblast, Russia

Russian-language surnames